Saccharopolyspora shandongensis is a bacterium from the genus Saccharopolyspora which has been isolated from wheat field soil in Shandong in China.

References

 

Pseudonocardineae
Bacteria described in 2008